Fritz Kredel (February 8, 1900 – April 12, 1973) was a German, later American artist and graphic designer.

Early years 
He was born in Michelstadt-im-Odenwald, then in the Grand Duchy of Hesse of the German Empire. In his early years, he studied under Rudolf Koch at Offenbach School of Art and Design, and developed skills in woodcuts. In 1920, he began studying at the Kunstgewerbeschule in Offenbach am Main. Koch and Kredel collaborated on A Book of Signs (1923) and The Book of Flowers (1930).  Following Koch's death in 1934,  Kredel moved to Frankfurt, but in 1938, he fled Germany for political reasons with help from Melbert Cary.

Career 
After emigrating to the United States that year, he taught at Cooper Union in New York and continued to work as an artist.  He produced illustrations for over 400 books in German and English and received many awards and honors. Many of his originals are now housed at the Art Library at Yale University.

Kredel illustrated Eleanor Roosevelt's children's book, Christmas (Alfred A. Knopf, 1940), and was commissioned to create a woodcut of the Presidential Seal for the inauguration of John F. Kennedy in 1961. He illustrated 21 volumes for George Macy's Limited Edition Club, the most of any of their illustrators (cf. Heritage Press), and the original World's Best Fairy Tales for Reader's Digest Association (1967). The Limited Edition Club titles include The Complete Andersen: All of the Stories of Hans Christian Andersen in Six Volumes, a limited edition of 1500 sets for the Limited Editions Club (completed as a set, 1949).  Kredel also colored the John Tenniel illustrations for Lewis Carroll's Alice's Adventures in Wonderland and Through the Looking-Glass for the 1946 Random House editions. From 1950 until his death Kredel received numerous awards, including Honorary Citizen Award from the Town of Michelstadt (1969). Died 12 of April 1973 in New York. Kredel was married to a woman who had been born Jewish, but who converted to Christianity while working with Rudolf Koch. Annie Kredel was a textile artist. The couple had two children.

References

Other Resources 
 
 
Brown Swanson, Mathilde Kredel (2013), Fritz Kredel: Artist, Illustrator and Grandfather, Printing History. Online

External links
 
 
 
Fritz Kredel Letters at the Newberry Library

1900 births
1973 deaths
American children's book illustrators
German children's book illustrators
German printmakers
20th-century illustrators of fairy tales
People from Michelstadt
German emigrants to the United States